Siedlung, a German word meaning settlement, may refer to several places:

Austria
Überlendner-Siedlung, a village in Upper Austria

Germany
Siedlung (Dessau), a quarter of Dessau, Saxony-Anhalt
Siedlung Eichkamp, a zone of Berlin
Siedlung Neu-Jerusalem, a zone of Berlin

See also
Stadtrandsiedlung (disambiguation)

List of "Siedlung" on de.wiki